Plumer  is a surname. Notable people with the surname include: 

 Arnold Plumer (1801–1869), member of the U.S. House of Representatives from Pennsylvania
 B. G. Plumer (1830–1886), American politician and businessman
 Daniel L. Plumer (1837–1920), American politician and businessman
 George Plumer (1762–1843), member of the U.S. House of Representatives from Pennsylvania
 Henry Plumer McIlhenny (1910–1986), American connoisseur of art and antiques, world traveller and socialite
 Herbert Plumer, 1st Viscount Plumer (1857–1932), British colonial official and soldier
 Lincoln Plumer (1875–1928), American silent film actor
 Marie-France Plumer (born 1943), French actress
 PattiSue Plumer (born 1962), American retired long-distance runner
 Polly Plumer, American track and field athlete
 Robert Plumer Ward (1765–1846), British novelist and politician
 Rose Plumer (1876–1955), American actress
 Thomas Plumer (1753–1824), British judge and politician
 Thomas Plumer Halsey (1815–1854), Member of Parliament for Hertfordshire
 William Plumer (disambiguation)

See also

 Plummer (surname)